The 24th School Wing is a disbanded United States Army Air Corps unit.  It was last assigned to the Air Corps Advanced Flying School, and was disbanded on 1 October 1931 at Kelly Field, Texas.  While active, the wing served as the headquarters for the Air Corps' three groups training aircrew, which were located in Texas and California.

The 24th School Wing is not related to the United States Air Force 24th Special Operations Wing, which was established on 19 November 1942.

History
The 24th School Wing was organized at Kelly Field, Texas in 1927 to command the flying training units of the Air Corps.   Air Corps Flying Schools were located in the San Antonio, Texas area at Kelly Field and at Brooks Field and at March Field near Riverside, California.

In 1922, the Air Corps had reorganized the method it used for pilot training, with Brooks Field, Texas becoming the center for primary training and Kelly Field, Texas the center for advanced training.   By 1927, three training squadrons had been set up at Brooks and five at Kelly.   With the beginning of the five-year expansion program of the Air Corps in 1926, it was found that the existing facilities in the San Antonio area would be insufficient to support the expansion, and a third training group would need to be established at March Field, a former World War I training field which had been closed in 1922.     With a third group of four squadrons at March, a wing was needed as an intermediate level of command to avoid having too many units being assigned directly to school Headquarters at Kelly Field.  Upon activation at Kelly Field, the wing transferred personnel from the 10th School Group.

In the late 1920s, the growth of the City of San Antonio created hazards for pilot training. In June 1927 General Frank Lahm suggested the construction of a single large field outside of the city to house all flying training. Congress funded the new field's construction but not the purchase of the land, so the city of San Antonio borrowed the $546,000 needed to purchase the site selected for what became Randolph Field. By the fall of 1931, construction was essentially completed at the new facility, so the Air Corps Training Center at Kelly Field and the primary schools at Brooks and March moved to the new installation.

With the opening of facilities at Randolph,  the school at March Field was closed and March became a tactical flying field.  The 24th School Wing was disbanded on 1 October 1931 and its subordinate units were absorbed into the Air Corps Primary Flying School at Randolph Field and the Advanced Flying School at Kelly Field.  Wing personnel were transferred to the 10th School Group

Lineage
 Constituted in the Organized Reserve on 23 March 1924 as 24th Wing Headquarters (School)
 Withdrawn from the Organized Reserve 1 August 1927 and allotted to the Regular Army
 Activated on 1 August 1927
 Redesignated as 24th Wing (School) in  July 1928
 Redesignated 24th School Wing on 8 March 1929
 Disbanded on 1 October 1931

Assignments
 12th Air Brigade (School), 23 March 1924 (Organized Army Reserve, not active)
 Air Corps Advanced Flying School, 1 August 19271 October 1931

Components
 10th School Group, 1 August 192715 July 1931
 Kelly Field, Texas
 11th School Group, 1 August 19271 October 1931
 Brooks Field, Texas
 13th School Group, 1 August 192730 April 1931
 March Field, California

Stations
 Kelly Field, Texas, 1 August 1927October 1931

See also

 Flying Division, Air Training Command
 Army Air Forces Training Command

References

Notes

Bibliography

 
 Manning, Thomas A. (2005), History of Air Education and Training Command, 1942–2002.  Office of History and Research, Headquarters, AETC, Randolph AFB, Texas 
 
 

Military units and formations of the United States Army Air Corps
Military units and formations established in 1924
Military units and formations disestablished in 1931
1924 establishments in Texas
1931 disestablishments in Texas